John Reed Yale (May 8, 1855 in Patterson, Putnam County, New York – July 17, 1925 in Albany, New York) was an American businessman and politician from New York. He served as President of Brewster Water Works and Chairman of the Committee on Railroads.

Life
He was the son of Belden Yale (born 1821) and Margaret (Glennen) Yale. He was a real estate expert and assessor; and engaged in a variety of businesses, among them the construction of roads and the Brewster water supply system. On May 8, 1880, he married Alice Penny (born 1858), and they had five daughters.

His daughter Florence Louise Yale (1890-1933) married to Capt. Philip D. Hoyt, the New York First Deputy Commissioner and father of modern traffic control in New York. He was also a Committee Expert under Secretary Herbert Hoover. His father, Morgan Howes Hoyt, was Chairman for the Democrats and launched President Franklin Delano Roosevelt political career.

In 1904 John R. Yale was chosen to be a delegate to the Republican National Convention which nominated Theodore Roosevelt for President. He was a member of the Masonic Fraternity, the Odd Fellows, Elks and the New York Young Republican Club.

Yale was a member of the New York State Assembly (Putnam Co.) in 1902, 1903, 1904, 1905, 1906, 1907, 1908, 1909, 1910, 1911, 1912 and 1913; and was Chairman of the Committee on Electricity, Gas and Water Supply from 1908 to 1910, and in 1912.

He was Vice Chairman of the New York State Commission for the Panama–Pacific International Exposition in 1915.

He was again a member of the State Assembly in 1921, 1922, 1923, 1924 and 1925; and was Chairman of the Committee on Railroads in 1922.

He died on July 17, 1925, in the Albany Hospital in Albany, New York, after a cancer operation; and was buried at the Milltown Cemetery in Brewster, New York.

References

Sources
 The New York Red Book by Edgar L. Murlin (1903; pg. 190)
 Official New York from Cleveland to Hughes by Charles Elliott Fitch (Hurd Publishing Co., New York and Buffalo, 1911, Vol. IV; pg. 346f, 349, 351f, 354, 356f, 359 and 361)
 State of New York at the Panama–Pacific International Exposition, San Francisco, California, 1915 (Albany, 1916; pg. 23f)
 JOHN R. YALE, DEAN OF ASSEMBLY, DEAD in NYT on July 18, 1925 (subscription required)
 Yale genealogy

External links

1855 births
1925 deaths
People from Patterson, New York
Republican Party members of the New York State Assembly
Deaths from cancer in New York (state)